Bjørn Klakegg (born 30 January 1958 in Skien, Norway) is a Norwegian jazz musician (guitar) and composer, known from a number of recordings and cooperations with the likes of Nils Petter Molvær, Sverre Gjørvad, Ernst-Wiggo Sandbakk, Frode Alnæs, Knut Værnes, Knut Reiersrud, Hanne Hukkelberg, Tove Karoline Knutsen, Terje Gewelt and Tore Brunborg.

Career 

With his brother the jazz pianist Rune Klakegg, he played in bands led by Guttorm Guttormsen as young. He studied music at "Toneheim folkehøgskole" (1978) and on the Jazz program at Trondheim Musikkonservatorium (1979–83). During his studies he established his own bands with amomong others his fellow students Nils Petter Molvær, Ernst-Wiggo Sandbakk, Frode Alnæs and Tore Brunborg, before he settled in Oslo and joined Sun, Extended Noise, Out to Lunch and Nuku. He plays in the Sverre Gjørvad Quartett and has otherwise contributed to releases by Tove Karoline Knutsen, Elsa Kvamme (1990) and Terje Gewelt (2004 and 2007). He leads his own quartet with Harald Skullerud (percussion), Andreas Utnem (keyboards) and Per Willy Aaserud (trumpet). In recent years he has toured with Rikskonsertene, in the production På hodet og bak frem, together with Celio de Carvalho and Nils Einar Vinjor, and contributed to the Ingun Bjørnsgaard projects with his compositions (together with Rolf Wallin). He has been a musician for several of NRK Radio Theatre's radio drama. He also plays in the group "Needlepoint" in collaboration with David Wallumrød, Nikolai Eilertsen (bass) and Thomas Strønen (drums), releasing the albums The Woods Are Not What They Seem (2010), Outside The Screen (2012) and Aimless Mary (2015).

Discography

Solo albums 
1998: Gloria (Curling Legs), with his own compositions together with Harald Skullerud
1999: Swing Waltz (Curling Legs)
2005: A day with no plans at all (Curling Legs), with his own compositions together with Harald Skullerud and Kåre Vestrheim
2008: Sidewalk View (BJK-music), with his own compositions together with Harald Skullerud, Andreas Utnem and Per Willy Aaserud

Collaborative works 
Within Out to Lunch
1988: Out to Lunch (Odin Records)

With Needlepoint
2010: The Woods Are Not What They Seem (BJK Music)
2012: Outside The Screen (BJK Music)
2015: Aimless Mary (BJK Music)
2018: The Diary of Robert Reverie (BJK Music)
2021: Walking up That Valley (BJK Music)

With Karin Krog & John Surman
2013: Songs About This And That (Meantime Records), including with Ivar Kolve, Terje Gewelt & Tom Olstad

With other projects
1992: Det absolutte nullpunkt (Curling Legs), within Nuku
2000: 4G (Curling Legs), with Frode Alnæs, Knut Værnes and Knut Reiersrud
2006: Sundslegen, herja og naken (Tylden & Co.), with Lars Klevstrand, Rune Klakegg & Jan Olav Renvåg
2007: Rykestrasse 68 (Nettwerk), with Hanne Hukkelberg
2009: Lost Animals (2009), with Vidar Johansen Quartet
2013: Spindrift'' (Resonant Music), with Terje Gewelt

References 

20th-century Norwegian guitarists
21st-century Norwegian guitarists
Norwegian jazz guitarists
Norwegian jazz composers
Male jazz composers
Norwegian University of Science and Technology alumni
Musicians from Skien
1958 births
Living people
20th-century guitarists
20th-century Norwegian male musicians
21st-century Norwegian male musicians
Needlepoint (band) members